A Fon is a chieftain or king of a region of Cameroon, especially among the Widikum, Tikar, and Bamiléké peoples of the Bamenda grass fields (the Northwest, West Region) and the Lebialem of the South West Region. They were a creation of German colonial rule to facilitate their governance. Many legitimate traditional rulers were replaced those who collaborated imposed and made Fons, while the British and French consolidated them as administrative traditional Chiefs an still considered as auxiliaries of the administration. They were only once independent family heads because the ethnic groups had cultural traditional leaders who weren't called Fons. For instance, the Tikars had Belaku for their original female traditional leaders of their kingdoms called Ngoung (Belaka) for the male leaders. Germans created and brought most Fons under German rule or military subjugation during the colonial period and it has remained so till date.  Following the defeat of Germany in World War I, the Fons of British Cameroon came under British rule, and the Fons of French Cameroon came under French rule. Since Cameroon's independence in 1961, the Fons are under the jurisdiction of the Government of Cameroon. However, they maintain semi-autonomous union councils and jurisdiction over their hereditary land. 

Some of the historically significant Fons of the Northwest are:

 Doh Gahnyonga II (Fon of Bali Nyonga)
 Fon Angwafo III of Mankon
 Fon Asanji II of Chomba
 Fon of Anong-Timah Bamtie
 Fon of Ashong
 Fon of Awing
 Fon of Kung HRM. Fon KUM Gilbert
 Fon of Bali-Gansin
 Fon of Bali-Gashu
 Fon of Bali-Gham
 Fon of Bangwa
 Fon of Batibo
 Fon of Bessi
 Fon of Bum
 Fon of Mbessa. HRM Fon Njong III
 Fon of Zang Tabi
 Fon of Guzang
 Fon of Mendankwe
 Fon of Bafut
 Fon of Nso
 Fon of Bafanji
 Fon of Oku. HRM Fon Ngum IV
In the Southwest region, only Lebialem division has Fons, the most notable of them being The Fon of Fontem.
 Asabaton Fontem, Fon of Fontem
 Lekunze, Fon of Bamumbu
 Fotabong Achenjang, Fon of Lewoh
 Fonjumetaw, Fon of Nwehbetaw
 Nicasius Nguazong, Fon of Fossungu Nguazong

List of incumbents

This table provides a list of current Fons in Cameroon.

References

Government of Cameroon